Robert Healey may refer to:

Robert Healey (cricketer) (born 1934), English right-handed batsman
Robert J. Healey (1957–2016), American businessman and political candidate from Rhode Island
Robert Healey, American labor union leader, headed Chicago Federation of Labor

See also
Robert Healy (disambiguation)
Healey (surname)